"I Ain't All Bad" is a song written by Johnny Duncan, and recorded by American country music artist Charley Pride.  It was released in March 1975 as the first single from his album Charley.  The song peaked at number 6 on the Billboard Hot Country Singles chart. It also reached number 1 on the RPM Country Tracks chart in Canada.

Chart performance

References

1975 singles
1975 songs
Charley Pride songs
Songs written by Johnny Duncan (country singer)
Song recordings produced by Jack Clement
RCA Records singles